"The Boyfriend" (also known as "The New Friend") is an hour long episode of the sitcom Seinfeld. It makes up the 34th and 35th episodes of the show, and 17th and 18th episodes of the show's third season. It first aired on February 12, 1992.
 In the "extras" section of the Season 3 DVD, Jerry Seinfeld says it is his favorite episode. The first extended episode of the series, it was later split into two parts for syndication; the original version can be seen on the season 3 DVD and Netflix.

Plot

Part 1
Jerry meets an idol of his—former New York Mets baseball player Keith Hernandez (appearing as himself)—and wants to make a good impression. Meanwhile, George is out of time on his unemployment and he works harder than ever on his scheme to get a 13-week extension. He tells the unemployment office that he was close to a job with Vandelay Industries, a company made up by George that makes latex products and whose main office's phone number is Jerry's apartment. He asks Jerry to answer each phone call as "Vandelay Industries," which he does with his own alias, "Kal Varnsen." Upon finding out Jerry has befriended Keith, Kramer and Newman accuse Keith of spitting on them after a past Mets game by the players parking lot at Shea Stadium; however, Jerry supports a "second-spitter theory" in which Keith is not involved. George is busted by his unemployment officer after an out-of-the-loop Kramer answers Jerry's phone and tells her the number is for an apartment. Keith asks Jerry about Elaine's relationship status, then makes a date with her, breaking a date he previously made with Jerry.

Part 2
George tries to curb losing his benefits by taking the officer's daughter (Carol Ann Susi) out for a date. She dumps George by the end of the second date after she realizes he has no prospects, which causes him to express to Jerry his desire to date a tall woman. Jerry becomes jealous that Keith is spending more of his time dating Elaine. Elaine ends the relationship because he smokes. When Keith asks Jerry to help him move his furniture, Jerry considers this too large a favor given how little time they've known each other and ends their friendship. Right then, Kramer and Newman confront Keith about the "spitting incident". Keith tells them that he saw the real spitter: Mets relief pitcher Roger McDowell. Kramer and Newman then remember that they had taunted McDowell throughout the game and the pair apologize to Keith, and offer to help move his furniture. George rushes in with one last desperate attempt to win over his unemployment officer by getting Keith to meet her, but he is too late. As he mopes, a tall woman appears with his wallet, which he had dropped on the sidewalk outside, causing George to give a happy smile.

Production
The "spitting incident" depicted in the story is a parody of the 1991 film JFK. Jerry presents the "magic loogie theory", a reference to the "magic bullet theory" featured in the film. The recount of the incident in the episode resembles the Zapruder film in JFK, as it uses the same color and photography effects. The episode features Wayne Knight (as Newman), who appeared in JFK in the same position as the scene it depicts. 

Originally, the script was written where the actual spitter was going to be Darryl Strawberry, but due to Strawberry having legal issues at the time of production, Larry David and Jerry Seinfeld believed that it wouldn't look good for Strawberry's image to be portrayed as spitting on fans, so Roger McDowell, a friend of Keith Hernandez, was written in Strawberry's place.

An alternative ending was filmed where the tall woman gives George his wallet, and George thanks her then shows her the door. When she asks George if he wants anything else, George, after a pause, shakes his head "No" and closes the door on her. When Jerry looks at him in disbelief, George shrugs, "Not my type," causing Jerry to roll his eyes in exasperation.

Reception and legacy

TV Guide ranked the episode fourth in their 1997 list of the 100 Greatest TV Episodes of All Time.

On June 23, 2010, Jerry Seinfeld called four innings of a Mets game at Citi Field against the Detroit Tigers on SportsNet New York, reuniting him with Hernandez, now an analyst for SNY. During that time, he revealed that if Hernandez had turned them down they would have asked Gary Carter to take his place.

References

External links

Seinfeld (season 3) episodes
1992 American television episodes
Television episodes written by Larry David
Seinfeld episodes in multiple parts